Stephen L. Braga is an American lawyer, best known for his pro bono representation of Martin Tankleff and the West Memphis Three.  He also represented Michael Scanlon, the number two target in the Jack Abramoff Indian lobbying scandal. Braga is currently the Director of the Appellate Litigation Clinic at the University of Virginia School of Law. In addition, he chairs the national white collar practice at Bracewell LLP.

West Memphis Three representation
Damien Echols, Jason Baldwin, and Jessie Misskelley, Jr., referred to in the media as the West Memphis Three, had been incarcerated since 1993 in Arkansas for the murders of three young boys. In the 18 years that followed, DNA testing, jury misconduct, and other new pieces of evidence raised doubt about the involvement of the three men in the crime. In 2009, Braga joined Echol's legal team and took the lead on efforts to retry the three men., Braga developed a strategy involving a legal compromise: the Alford plea. As he explained to the National Law Journal: '"What is the middle ground between insistence on guilt by the prosecutors and insistence on innocence by the defendants?" He concluded: "The thing that seemed logical, the only safe harbor, was the Alford plea." His efforts were successful. After entering their Alford pleas, each of the defendants' sentences were deemed as time served, and finally, the men were released from prison on August 19, 2011.

Martin Tankleff appeal

From 1995 to 2008, Braga served as lead counsel on a team of volunteer lawyers and investigators which sought reversal of the 1990 conviction of Martin Tankleff for the murder of his parents. Tankleff had confessed to the murders after being falsely told by Detective James McCready that physical evidence implicated him and that his father had awoken at the hospital and identified Tankleff as the attacker. Tankleff later recanted the confession. The investigation team interviewed a long series of contacts, ultimately uncovering evidence from more than 20 witnesses that two other people had admitted to the murder. Braga argued the new evidence appeal that led to the order for a new trial.

Michael Scanlon representation
Braga is representing Michael Scanlon's appeal to the United States Supreme Court to allow amendment to his plea bargain in 2010 with regard to the Abramoff Indian Casino lobbying scandal. Braga is asking that Scanlon's agreement to renege on his agreement to reimburse the affected Indian tribes almost US$20 million, arguing that Scanlon had no fiduciary duty to the tribes.

Background
Braga received his B.A., cum laude, from Fairfield University in 1978 and his J.D., magna cum laude, from the Georgetown University Law Center in 1981, where he was an Editor of the Georgetown Law Journal.

Braga began his legal career clerking for one year for The Honorable Thomas A. Flannery of the United States District Court for the District of Columbia. He has practiced law at Miller, Cassidy, Larroca & Lewin, Baker Botts, and Ropes & Gray. In 2019, Braga joined Bracewell LLP to chair the firm's national white collar defense practice.

Braga taught law as an adjunct professor at the Georgetown University Law Center.

External links
University of Virginia School of Law profile

References

American lawyers
Fairfield University alumni
Georgetown University Law Center alumni
University of Virginia School of Law faculty
Living people
Year of birth missing (living people)
Place of birth missing (living people)